Charles Littleleaf, a Native American flute player and flute maker, is a tribal member of the Warm Springs Indian Reservation, Oregon. Charles is also an honorary member of the Piikani Nation, Alberta, Canada, and is the son of the late Chief Jack Littleleaf of Brocket, Alberta.

Native American flute player

In 1992, Warm Springs tribal member, Charles Littleleaf, received from a flute Native American flutist, R. Carlos Nakai. Nakai's gift was intended to encourage Charles to learn the instrument. The following year, Nakai held one of the first Native American flute workshops at the Feathered Pipe Ranch in Helena, Montana and invited Charles to attend.

The Feather Pipe workshop lasted two weeks and it was here, amidst players much more technically versed in music, where Charles learned one of the best lessons regarding the traditional flute: that playing from the heart and spirit is where some of the most beautiful Native American flute music will come from.

In search of ways to further express his heart, Charles continued to play the flute without instruction. Through these instruments, he also found an emotional way to release healing qualities would not only benefit all of mankind. At the beginning of this musical journey, Charles played the flute at the home of his ancestors, primarily to family and friends. This is where the first samples of Charles' music developed.

Later in years, Charles continues playing and enjoying the native flute. He has grounded his flute playing within the essence of Mother Earth and from memories growing up on his reservation which he shares with audiences around the world.

Native American flute maker

Charles Littleleaf has been constructing concert Native American flutes for over 15 years for both professionals and beginners alike.

Discography

Whispers of Earth Medicine 1997, Littleleaf Music (formerly Redwood Productions)
Ancient Reflections 2002, Littleleaf Music
Essence of Life 2019, Littleleaf Music

Collaboration
Heart of the Wolf (flute/vocals with Karen Therese) 2001, Red Feather Music

Credits
 Just Plain Folks Award for 'Song of the Year', Eagle Spirit from artist's Ancient Reflections CD, Los Angeles, CA (2008)
 Featured article in Celebrity Magazine, Cowboys and Indians (Sept. 2007)
 Artist documentary on flute making and biography, Oregon Art Beat, Oregon Public Broadcasting (2004)
 Music soundtrack for the documentary The Oregon Story, Tribal Economies, Oregon Public Broadcasting (2001)
 Native American Music Award (NAMA) Nominee (2001)

References

External links
 Charles Littleleaf website: 

American people of First Nations descent
Confederated Tribes of Warm Springs
Native American flautists
Native American flute players
Native American male artists
Musicians from Oregon
Living people
1948 births
20th-century American musicians
20th-century American male musicians
21st-century American musicians
21st-century American male musicians
20th-century flautists
21st-century flautists
Piikani Nation